The Chainarol, also spelt as Chainalol (literally, "Way of the warrior"), is an ancient Meitei puya which records the armed combats of various gladiators through different periods of history of Ancient Manipur. It consists of 27 stories of real life incidents of the dual fight between different gladiators. Various scholars believe that the first entry in the text is a personal combat dating back to the 1st century AD and the latest episode dating back to the 2nd half of the 16th century AD.

Bibliography 

 https://archive.org/details/in.ernet.dli.2015.465362

References 

Meitei culture
Puyas
Pages with unreviewed translations